Achaea echo is a species of moth of the family Erebidae. It is found from Equatorial West Africa to South Africa., including Sierra Leone, Ghana and Zimbabwe The larvae feed on Poaceae and Panicum species, but have also been recorded on Citrus.

References

External links 
 Zimbabwe Flora

Achaea (moth)
Moths described in 1858
Erebid moths of Africa
Moths of Africa